Tax Free was a Dutch band from Amsterdam. It was founded by singer Wally Tax in 1969 after disbanding of The Outsiders. The group also featured David Oliphant (guitar), Jody Purpora on vocals, guitar and keyboards and Leendert "Buzz" Busch (drums). 
At the beginning of 1970, the band travelled to New York, where they recorded their eponymous debut album. It was produced by Lewis Merenstein and featured violist/multi-instrumentalist John Cale, with whom Merenstein collaborated on number of projects including his debut album Vintage Violence. Bassist Richard Davis also played on this album. It was released in March 1971 and soon after broke up.

Discography
Tax Free (Polydor, 1971)

References

External links
Tax Free at Allmusic
Tax Free at Discogs

Dutch psychedelic rock music groups
Musical groups established in 1969
Musical groups disestablished in 1971